Provo Peak is a mountain peak in the Wasatch Range and the Uinta National Forest that is located within the city limits of Provo, Utah, United States. Although located along the Wasatch Front, it is situated behind (east-southeast) of Y Mountain.

The trapper Étienne Provost is the peak's namesake, also of the city of Provo. Near the top of the peak are multiple parallel terraces that can be easily seen from the valley floor from the west or south. These were created in the 1930s by CCC workers to reduce the severe erosion caused by overgrazing on the slopes of the peak.

See also
 List of mountains of Utah
 List of mountain peaks of Utah

References

External links
 
 Provo Peak at peakbagger.com
 Provo Peak at summitpost.com
 Provo Peak at utahhikinginfo.com

Provo, Utah
Wasatch Range
Mountains of Utah
Mountains of Utah County, Utah
Uinta National Forest